A store detective (also known as Asset Protection Investigator, undercover shopper, Loss Prevention Detective, and Asset Protection Specialist) is a member of loss prevention whose main role is to prevent and detect theft (commonly known as shoplifting) and reduce shrink in retail outlets. They do this by patrolling the store in plain clothes looking to identify members of the public who are stealing from the store. More common terms today with major retailers are loss prevention agent, detective or investigator and asset protection officer.  Special officer, once common, is now rarely used, as few jurisdictions still allow it.

Store detectives are still very common and are used in almost all locations of Target, Walmart, JCPenney, Macy's, Nordstrom, Sephora, and other large retailers.

Overview 

Store detectives may be self-employed on a contract basis but most are employees of the retailer, or of a security firm with an outsourcing arrangement with the retailer, or of an agency with a similar agreement.

The job involves patrolling stores in the role of an ordinary shopper, watching for shoplifters. The detective observes any shopper behaving suspiciously and keeps a mental record of such observations. The objective of the store detective is to observe a complete crime taking place. They achieve this by observing a shoplifter approaching an item, appropriating the item (picking it up), concealing the item (not always) and leaving the store having not paid for said item. The key difference between a store detective and a security guard is that the former's role is covert. If they observe an individual shoplifting, they may detain them as they attempt to exit the store or apprehend the suspect(s) during the theft. Laws vary greatly from jurisdiction to jurisdiction regarding what constitutes the crime of shoplifting and how a suspect may be detained/arrested. In Canada, detectives may arrest the individual utilizing powers given to them by the Criminal Code. In the United States, each state has different but similar shopkeeper's privilege laws that allow the arrest and detainment of shoplifters. 

It is standard practice that stores require their detectives to have stable work histories and no criminal record. Common backgrounds include the armed services, fire and rescue services, security and policing. In the UK, distance learning courses in store detection are offered by many organizations and the store detective must be in receipt of an SIA (Security Industry Agency) license. Training in security management studies is available from numerous training providers – at various levels. In the US, many states require store detectives to be licensed security officers.

Additional responsibilities 
Many retail companies assign the task of investigating check and credit card fraud activity as well as employee theft activity to the store detective.  They work closely with law enforcement on such cases whether it is on the local, state or federal level. Companies sometimes also assign the store detective the task of searching employee lockers and bags at random.

Typically store detectives in retail are commonly known either as loss prevention or asset protection.  Management and field investigator functions also exist commonly within the loss prevention/asset protection sector of retail.

Techniques and tools of the trade 
A store detective has several techniques that they use to detect shoplifters. Keen observational skills is the primary weapon alongside good teamwork with security guards and the use of CCTV. An ability to blend in with other shoppers in a variety of shopping environments is also key.  They usually have a clear understanding of the law as it applies to their role depending on jurisdiction.

Most store detectives are unarmed but are trained in arrest and restraint techniques. Some also carry covert microphone and earpieces attached to a radio (sometimes radio-linked to shopping centres and other retail establishments) in order to effectively monitor suspected shoplifters as they move through an area.

See also 
 Hotel detective
 Retail loss prevention

References 

Private detectives and investigators
Theft
Protective service occupations